Lantz is an unincorporated community in Barbour County, West Virginia, United States.

The community was named after George W. Lantz, who was instrumental in securing a post office for the town.

References 

Unincorporated communities in West Virginia
Unincorporated communities in Barbour County, West Virginia